TV Wackersdorf is a German sports club from Wackersdorf, which was founded in 1912 as Turnverein "Glück-Auf" Wackersdorf 1912 e.V. The club's futsal team plays in the Futsal-Regionalliga, which is the highest level of futsal in Germany.

Futsal 

Wackersdorf's futsal team entered the Bayernliga in its inaugural season of 2014/15 and immediately won the league title and promotion to the top division. Wackersdorf are founding members of the Futsal-Regionalliga Süd and finished their first season in the highest division in third place, missing the playoffs for the DFB Futsal Cup by a measly 3 points. During the off-season, they won their own international futsal tournament against German and Czech Republican top teams and the Portus Rothaus Cup in Pforzheim. Wackersdorf took part in the 2016 Mitropa Futsal Cup in Vienna, which is considered one of the most important futsal competitions in Europe. As the first-ever German team to participate in the tournament, they lost to Austrian side Stella Rossa Wien and Hungarian champions and title defenders Győri ETO Futsal Club, but at least won a point against Czech first division side FC Tango Hodonin. The side struggled in the beginning of their second season, but then started to pick up towards the end to finish in fourth place. Over the next few seasons the team is at high tide and fails to do anything memorable. The 19/20 season started off very good, as the team strength boosted the quality of the new transfer players from the First League of Sarbia to make a very good and quality team. By the middle of the team season, Ivan Vuletic and Aleksandar Milenkovic had left, and Christopher Parzefall again was welded to the spot, and Bulgarian national player Marko Kostic was attracted, who was also the coach of the team.

Team Photos

League results

Recent seasons
The recent season-by-season performance of the club:

All time

; ; .

Honours 

Futsal-Bayernliga:
Winners (1): 2015
Futsal-Regionalliga Süd:
3rd place: 2016
Mitropa Futsal Cup:
4th place: 2016
International Wackersdorf Cup:
Winners (1): 2016
Portus Rothaus Cup in Pforzheim:
Winners (1): 2016

Notable players 
The list of notable TV Wackersdorf players 
As of 4 Januar 2020

Bold represents current players.

Team

Current squad
As of 1 February 2020

Foreign players

Technical staff
  Head Coach: Marko Kostic
  Coach:Stoyan Stoykov
  Team Manager: Boris Radisavljevic
  Sports Director: Filip Hristov
  Supervisor: Viktor Ristov

National Players
  Borislav Stoyanov
  Marko Kostic

Sporthalle Wackersdorf

The Wackersdorf Sporthalle is located on Hauptstraße 20 in the city of the same name and has all the necessary resources to spend on the Futsal game and a wide variety of sports. The hall has a capacity of 1000 seats, as well as a light panel and sound.

References

External links
 Official website

Futsal clubs in Germany
Sports clubs established in 1912
1912 establishments in Germany
Futsal clubs established in 2014